Hugo Ricardo Lavinas Castro Mendonça Ventosa (born 8 May 1989 in Póvoa de Santa Iria, Vila Franca de Xira, Lisbon District) is a Portuguese professional footballer who plays for Real S.C. as a right back.

References

External links

Portuguese League profile 

1989 births
Living people
People from Vila Franca de Xira
Portuguese footballers
Association football defenders
Liga Portugal 2 players
Segunda Divisão players
S.U. Sintrense players
Sertanense F.C. players
S.C.U. Torreense players
S.C. Farense players
C.D. Mafra players
F.C. Alverca players
Real S.C. players
Sportspeople from Lisbon District